Malankuravan (Mala Koravan, Malakkuravan) is an unclassified Dravidian language of southern India, on the southern border of Kerala and Tamil Nadu. It may be a dialect of Malayalam with Tamil influence or a language closely related to Malayalam.

References

Dravidian languages
Malayalam language